The 198th Division()(2nd Formation) was formed in November 1969 from 5th District, Engineer Corps. 

The first formation of the 198th Division had been disbanded earlier in the 1960s and the division HQ transferred to the Navy. 

From 1969 the division was a part of 66th Army Corps.

As of 1969 the division was composed of:
592nd Infantry Regiment;
593rd Infantry Regiment;
594th Infantry Regiment;
Artillery Regiment.

In 1985 the division was disbanded.

References

中国人民解放军各步兵师沿革，http://blog.sina.com.cn/s/blog_a3f74a990101cp1q.html

Infantry divisions of the People's Liberation Army
Military units and formations disestablished in 1985
Military units and formations established in 1969